The Battle of Xuchang was fought between the National Revolutionary Army of the Republic of China and a coalition opposing Chiang Kai-shek. Both sides were part of the Kuomintang. Chiang Kai-shek's forces attacked but failed to capture Xuchang.

Bibliography
中華民國國防大學編，《中國現代軍事史主要戰役表》

Conflicts in 1930